In the Charsadda bombing of 9 February 2008, a suicide bomber killed at least 27 people and another 50 were injured in Charsadda, Pakistan attending a political rally for the opposition Awami National Party. No group has claimed responsibility for the attack, but Interior Minister Hamid Nawaz Khan suspected Al-Qaeda or Taliban-linked groups were responsible after threatening all political parties in the North-West Frontier Province. The bombing occurred nine days before the 2008 Pakistani general election which was postponed in the wake of the assassination of Benazir Bhutto.

References

2008 murders in Pakistan
21st-century mass murder in Pakistan
Suicide bombings in Pakistan
Terrorist incidents in Pakistan in 2008
Mass murder in 2008
Crime in Khyber Pakhtunkhwa